Olaf Emil Frydenlund (16 June 1862 in Tune – 8 April 1947 in Aremark) was a Norwegian sport shooter who competed in the early 20th century in rifle shooting. He participated in Shooting at the 1900 Summer Olympics in Paris and won the silver medal with the Norwegian Military Rifle team.

References

External links
 

1862 births
1947 deaths
Norwegian male sport shooters
ISSF rifle shooters
Olympic silver medalists for Norway
Olympic shooters of Norway
Shooters at the 1900 Summer Olympics
People from Østfold
Olympic medalists in shooting
Medalists at the 1900 Summer Olympics
Sportspeople from Viken (county)
20th-century Norwegian people